Ravne pri Zdolah is a settlement in the hills north of Krško in eastern Slovenia. The area is part of the traditional region of Styria. It is now included in the Lower Sava Statistical Region.

Name
The name of the settlement was changed from Ravne to Ravne pri Zdolah in 1953.

Cultural heritage
There is a small chapel-shrine in the settlement dedicated to the Virgin Mary. It was built in 1927.

References

External links
Ravne pri Zdolah on Geopedia

Populated places in the Municipality of Krško